John Gobbi (born September 25, 1981) is a Swiss former professional ice hockey defenceman who played for HC Ambrì-Piotta, Genève-Servette HC, the ZSC Lions and Lausanne HC in the National League (NL).

Gobbi is currently the CEO of HC Fribourg-Gottéron.

Gobbi appeared in 785 regular season games (171 points) in the NL, as well as 144 playoffs games, putting up 33 points.

He participated at the 2011 IIHF World Championship as a member of the Switzerland men's national ice hockey team.

Career statistics

References

External links

1981 births
Bolzano HC players
Genève-Servette HC players
HC Ambrì-Piotta players
HC Sierre players
Lausanne HC players
ZSC Lions players
Living people
Swiss ice hockey defencemen
People from Faido
Sportspeople from Ticino